Raoul Heide (13 October 1888 – 21 February 1978) was a Norwegian fencer. He competed in the team and individual épée events at the 1924 and 1928 Summer Olympics.

References

External links
 

1888 births
1978 deaths
Norwegian male épée fencers
Olympic fencers of Norway
Fencers at the 1924 Summer Olympics
Fencers at the 1928 Summer Olympics
20th-century Norwegian people